JEG may refer to:
 Jeg Coughlin Jr. (born 1970), American motorsports driver
 Aasiaat Airport, in Greenland
 Cheng language